Henry Risk "Dick" Harley (August 18, 1874 – May 16, 1961) was a pitcher in Major League Baseball. He played for the Boston Beaneaters in 1905.

References

External links

1874 births
1961 deaths
Major League Baseball pitchers
Boston Beaneaters players
Baseball players from Ohio
Sportspeople from Springfield, Ohio
Baton Rouge Cajuns players
Baton Rouge Red Sticks players
Syracuse Stars (minor league baseball) players
Atlanta Crackers players